is a former Japanese football player.

Playing career
Akimoto was born in Oita Prefecture on April 15, 1979. He joined J1 League club Sanfrecce Hiroshima from youth team in 1998. On September 5, he debuted against Shimizu S-Pulse. During his two seasons at the club he only played one league game. He retired from football at the end of the 1999 season.

Club statistics

References

External links

1979 births
Living people
Association football people from Ōita Prefecture
Japanese footballers
J1 League players
Sanfrecce Hiroshima players
Association football forwards